Sir Charles Peter Scott  is a British former diplomat, and was Ambassador to Norway from 1975 to 1977.

He married Rachael Lloyd Jones, and their daughter is the art historian Katie Scott.

References

Living people
20th-century British diplomats
Year of birth missing (living people)
Place of birth missing (living people)